Seventh Channel Communications is an Indian film production and distribution company formed in 1985. It produced several Tamil language television serials films in the 1990s, and is headed by Manickam Narayanan.

History 
Seventh Channel Communications was set up in 1985 by Manickam Narayanan. After beginning his career as a photographer, Manickam went on to make programmes for Doordarshan. The studio went on to become a premier producer for Tamil television serials and films in the 1990s. During the peak of its operation, the studio was able to attract several film actors to work on television serials including Sivakumar, Roja and S. P. Balasubrahmanyam. The studio has also been involved in the restaurant business, the hosting of live entertainment shows, the International Tamil Film Awards, and the Tamil Nadu Film Festival.

In 2005, Seventh Channel Communications stepped in to take over the production of Gautham Vasudev Menon's Vettaiyaadu Vilaiyaadu (2006) starring Kamal Haasan, after the producers at Roja Combines and Oscar Films opted out.

The studio produced Magizh Thirumeni's Mundhinam Paartheney (2010) featuring newcomers Sanjay, Ekta Ghosla, Lizna, Pooja and Vithagan (2011) starring Parthiban and Poorna. In the early 2010s, Seventh Channel collaborated with Star Vijay to dub and release Mahabharat (2013) in the Tamil language.

Filmography 
Films as producer

Television series as producer

 Ethanai Manidhargal
 Srirangathu Devathaigal
 Kanavugall Illavasam
 Alai Osai
 Vaazhkai
 Marakkamudiyavillai
 Pennmanam
 Marupadiyum Aval
 Uravugal Oru Thodarkadhai
 Marupakkam
 Madhumita
 Pandian Parisu
 Nadhi Enge Pogiradhu

References 

Film distributors of India
Film production companies based in Chennai
Indian film studios
1985 establishments in Tamil Nadu
Indian companies established in 1985
Mass media companies established in 1985